The Bacteroidales-2 RNA motif is a conserved RNA structure that was discovered by bioinformatics.
Bacteroidales-2 motifs are found in Bacteroidales.
Bacteroidales-2 RNAs likely function in trans as sRNAs.

Bacteroidales-2 RNAs are relatively large compared to most other bacterial sRNAs, averaging just over 400 nucleotides.  Despite this large size, Bacteriodales-2 RNAs exhibit a relatively simple secondary structure, being composed mainly of hairpins.

Bacteroidales-2 RNAs often occur adjacent to large regions that do not appear to encode proteins.  A possible weak association with Mu-like phages was proposed.  The hairpin on the 3' end of the Bacteroidales-2 motif might function as a Rho-independent transcription terminator.

References

Non-coding RNA